Kool Skools is a multimedia and recording project for secondary school students across the Australian states of Victoria and New South Wales. The projects are open to all secondary schools, council youth agencies and youth clubs.  Kool Skools promotes, develops and supports a diverse range of talent and genres of contemporary music.  Participants of Kool Skools have the opportunity to work within a professional recording environment to record and package an album of music. At the end of each year an awards night is held where participants have the opportunity to perform some of their songs and are recognised for their work throughout the year.

High profile participants with professional releases

 Missy Higgins
 Delta Goodrem
 Tom Ugly
 Anthony Callea
 The Cat Empire (group)
 Dean Geyer
 Casey Donovan
 Axle Whitehead
 White Summer
 The Mellows
 Say Please 
 The Quarters
 Shane Price

JB HiFi Music Prize Recipients
2007: The Heave (NSW)

2007: [is] Featuring Tom Ugly

2008: Bad Day's Goodnight featuring Natasha Duarté (NSW)

2008: Zygotic (NSW)

2009: Unsafe Thort (VIC)

2009: No Pressure (NSW)

2010: The Kalaharis (VIC)

2010: The Chestnuts (NSW)

2011: The Razz (VIC)

2011: Jeff (NSW)

2012: Kelebec (NSW)
2013: Natasha Eloise (NSW)

2013: Bonney Ranch (VIC)

2014: The Mellows (VIC)

2014: SheWolf (VIC)

2015: Cooper Lower (VIC)

Koolest Skool Award winners

Victoria
 2021: 25th Year TBA
 2020: This year was cancelled due to the Covid 19 Pandemic
 2019: Victory Christian College
 2018:  Mount Lilydale Mercy College
 2017:  Mill Park Secondary College
 2016:  Mount Lilydale Mercy College
 2015:  Mill Park Secondary College
 2014:  Emmanuel College, Warrnambool
 2013:  Thomastown SC
 2012:  Notre Dame College
 2011:  Albury Youth Cafe (a combination of Albury/Wodonga schools)
 2010:  Copperfield College
 2009:  Thomastown Secondary College
 2008:  Noble Park Secondary College 
 2007:  Notre Dame College
 2006:  Geelong Grammar  
 2005:  Notre Dame College 
 2004:  Thomastown Secondary College
 2003:  Pakenham Secondary College
 2002:  Wangaratta High School
 2001:  Heathdale Christian College
 2000:  East Gippsland Schools, including Lakes Entrance and Bairnsdale
 1999:  Wangaratta High School
 1998:  Billanook College
 1997:  Swinburne Snr Secondary College

New South Wales
 2021: 25th Year TBA
 2020: Cancelled year due to Covid 19 Pandemic
 2019: Cancelled due to Sydney Studio closure
 2018:  Canterbury Girls High School
 2017:  Canterbury Girls High School
 2016:  Mackellar Girls Campus 
 2015:  Mackellar Girls Campus 
 2014:  St Andrews College
 2013:  N/A
 2012:  N/A
 2011:  Brisbane Water Secondary College
 2010:  Fairfield City Council, Bring It On Festival
 2009:  Brisbane Waters Secondary College
 2008:  Manly Council Youth Services
 2007:  Brisbane Water Secondary College
 2006:  Loseby Park Youth Centre
 2005:  Mackellar Girls Campus
 2004:  (not held in NSW in 2004)
 2003:  Brisbane Water Secondary College
 2002:  Brisbane Water Secondary College
 2001:  Prairiewood Languages High School
 2000:  Port Hacking High School

Recording Studios Involved

Melbourne, Victoria
 Studio 52 1997-2019

 Studio 52 / Empire Music Studios - 2019 onwards

Sydney, NSW
 Velvet Sound 2000 - 2004 

 Troy Horse Studios 2005 - 2010

 Megaphon Studios 2011 - 2016

 Music Feeds Studios 2017 - 2018

Hobart, Tasmania
 Red Planet. 2003 - 2006

Adelaide, SA
 Fat Trax 2003 - 2005

 Mixmasters, Adelaide city based studio. 2006

Brisbane & GC, QLD
 Gingerman Studios - Brian Cadd's Gold Coast home studio

 Troy Horse Brisbane

Perth, WA
 Initially booked for Planet Studios but didn't go ahead due to the studio burning down prior to any projects confirmed

References

https://www.facebook.com/KoolSkools

 Kool Skools website

 studio website

YouTube channel

  studio instagram

  project public Instagram handle

The Kool Skools Project - c/o Studio 52 & Empire Music Studios Melbourne (Coordinator: Paul Higgins)
Education in Australia